The Kyrgyz alphabets (Yañalif: Qьrƣьz alfaviti) are the alphabets used to write the Kyrgyz language. The Kyrgyz language uses the following alphabets:

The Cyrillic script is officially used in the Kyrgyz Republic (Kyrgyzstan)
The Arabic script is officially used in Afghanistan, Pakistan and the People's Republic of China (China) in the Kizilsu Kyrgyz Autonomous Prefecture, the Ili Kazakh Autonomous Prefecture of the Xinjiang Uyghur Autonomous Region.
Kyrgyz Braille

The Arabic script was traditionally used to write Kyrgyz before the introduction of the first Latin-based alphabets in 1927. Today an Arabic alphabet is used in China. The New Turkic Alphabet was used in the USSR in the 1930s until its replacement by a Cyrillic script. The Kyrgyz Cyrillic alphabet is the alphabet used in Kyrgyzstan. It contains 36 letters: 33 from the Russian alphabet with 3 additional letters for sounds of the Kyrgyz language: Ң, Ү, Ө.

Kyrgyzstan announced in September 2022 that it is considering switching to the Latin alphabet.

Correspondence chart
Correspondence chart of four Kyrgyz alphabets: the Kyrgyz Cyrillic and Kyrgyz Braille alphabets used in Kyrgyzstan, the Kyrgyz Latin alphabet used 1928–1938 in the Kirghiz Soviet Socialist Republic and the Kyrgyz Arabic alphabet used in Afghanistan, Pakistan and Xinjiang, China. In this correspondence chart, the Cyrillic alphabet is written in its official order. The Arabic and Latin equivalents are not written in their official alphabetical orders but have been listed around the Cyrillic for ease of understanding.

The letter H is not present in the Kyrgyz alphabet. Instead, it was replaced by a mute sound. (e.g. "Шаар (Shaar)" (city) in Kyrgyz corresponds to Şahar/Şähär/Şəhər in other Turkic languages.)
 К (K) –  changes into  (Q) if precedes or succeeds by letters а, о, у, ы.
 Г (G) –  changes into  (Ğ) if precedes or succeeds by letters а, о, у, ы.

Text sample
Article 1 of the Universal Declaration of Human Rights

Arabic
The tabel below illustrates the letter order for Kyrgyz as the letter order differs based on whether it is being written in the Arabic versus Cyrillic alphabet. 

In earlier versions of the alphabet, the sequence «ییی» was used to represent ы/и; the sequence «ېېې» was instead used to represent й. This modification was likely undone because of «ېېې»'s historic role representing the /e/ sound. Although «ېېې» was never a part of standardized Persian or Chagatai orthography, it possibly had precedent as a scribal variation of representing /e/ and its modern-day role in Pashto and Uyghur is also representing /e/. For this reason Kasym Tynystanov likely erred on the side of caution and settled on the modern scheme shown above.

See also
Kyrgyz language
Romanization of Kyrgyz

References

External links 
 Kyrgyz Cyrillic – Latin - Arabic - Old turkic converter
 Kyrgyz – Latin converter
 Грамматический справочник – Письменность
 Kyrgyz Website in China using the Arabic script

Arabic alphabets
Cyrillic alphabets
Alphabets used by Turkic languages
Kyrgyz language
Arabic alphabets for South Asian languages